Eve Montelibano (born 1971) is a Filipino author of Tagalog popular romance novels in the Philippines.  She is the bestselling author of the Lothario romance book series.

Biography
Eve Montelibano was born in 1971. She graduated from the University of the Philippines in Diliman, Quezon City.
An interior designer and teacher by profession, Guinid is also a painter who is active in local visual arts guild activities and a member of a theatre group.  She was one of the founders  the Love Match brand of Tagalog pocketbooks, a paperback line that she cofounded after writing for Precious Hearts Romances (PHR).  She started the Lothario series when she was in her 20s.  As a writer, Guinid draws inspiration from the personal experiences of others as well as her own, in order to inspire her readers.

See also
Armine Rhea Mendoza
Babes Cajayon
Maria Teresa Cruz San Diego
Lualhati Bautista

References

1971 births
Living people
Filipino novelists
Filipino romantic fiction writers
Tagalog-language writers
University of the Philippines Diliman alumni
Interior designers
Filipino educators
Filipino stage actresses
Women romantic fiction writers
Filipino women novelists